The Unicorn is an American sitcom created by Bill Martin, Mike Schiff and Grady Cooper for CBS which premiered on September 26, 2019 and concluded on March 18, 2021. It stars Walton Goggins along with Rob Corddry, Omar Miller, Maya Lynne Robinson, Ruby Jay, MaKenzie Moss, Devin Bright, and Michaela Watkins in supporting roles. In May 2020, the series was renewed for a second season which premiered on November 12, 2020. In May 2021, the series was canceled after two seasons.

Premise
A recently widowed father with two daughters is encouraged by his friends to re-enter the dating scene. To his surprise he becomes highly sought after due to his status as both an eligible widower and as a devoted father. The show is set in Raleigh, North Carolina.

Cast and characters

Main
 Walton Goggins as Wade, the owner of a landscaping company and a single father trying to find a new balance in his life after his wife's death.
 Rob Corddry as Forrest, Wade's friend and Delia's husband who works as a human resources specialist.
 Omar Miller as Ben, a friend of Wade's who coaches the local soccer team and runs an audio technology company. Married to Michelle.
 Maya Lynne Robinson as Michelle, a friend of Wade's who is a stay-at-home mother of four and Ben's wife.
 Ruby Jay as Grace, Wade's older daughter.
 Makenzie Moss as Natalie, Wade's younger daughter.
 Devin Bright as Noah, Ben and Michelle's son.
 Michaela Watkins as Delia, Wade's pediatrician friend who is married to Forrest.

Recurring
 Betsy Brandt as Caroline, Wade's friend who manages a support group for widows.
 Sarayu Blue as Anna, a colleague of Delia's who briefly dates Wade.
 Cleo Fraser as Addie, Forrest and Delia's daughter.
 Princess K. Mapp as Sahai, Ben and Michele's daughter.
 Helen Hong as Emma, a member of Wade's support group.
 Cindy Drummond as Cynthia
 Natalie Zea as Shannon (season 2; guest season 1), Wade's love interest.

Guest
 Christina Moore as Lizzie ("Breaking Up is Hard to Do")
 Brittany Ishibashi as Lena ("Three Men Out" and "Put Your Mask on First")
 Missi Pyle as Ava ("Wade Delayed")
 Nicole Byer as Meg, Michelle's sister ("Breaking Up Is Hard to Do", "The Client" and "Out With the Old")
 Donal Logue as Denny ("The Client")
 Rob Riggle as Trey ("Work It" and "Put Your Mask on First")

Episodes

Series overview

Season 1 (2019–20)

Season 2 (2020–21)

Production

Development
On February 6, 2019, it was announced that CBS had given the production a pilot order. On May 9, 2019, it was announced that the production had been given a series order. The series was created by Bill Martin and Mike Schiff, who were also expected to executive produce, alongside Aaron Kaplan, Dana Honor, Wendi Trilling, and Peyton Reed. The production companies involved with the series are Trill TV, Kapital Entertainment and CBS Television Studios. On May 15, 2019, it was announced that the series would premiere in the fall of 2019 and air on Thursdays at 8:30 p.m. The series debuted on September 26, 2019. On October 22, 2019, the series received a back order of five episodes. On May 6, 2020, CBS renewed the series for a second season which premiered on November 12, 2020. On May 15, 2021, CBS canceled the series after two seasons.

Casting
In March 2019, it was announced that Walton Goggins, Rob Corddry, Michaela Watkins, Omar Benson Miller and Maya Lynne Robinson had been cast in the pilot's starring roles. Along with the announcement of the series order, it was reported that Ruby Jay and Makenzie Moss had joined the main cast. On October 7, 2020, it was announced that Natalie Zea was set to reprise her role as Shannon, the woman with whom Wade had a connection in the first season finale.

Release

Marketing
On May 15, 2019, CBS released the first official trailer for the series.

Reception

Critical response
On Rotten Tomatoes, the series holds an approval rating of 85% with an average rating of 6.87/10, based on 27 reviews. The website's critical consensus states, "Warm and funny, The Unicorn finds humor in unexpected places and shows off a whole new side of the talented Walton Goggins." On Metacritic, it has a weighted average score of 65 out of 100, based on 13 critics, indicating "generally favorable reviews".

Ratings

Overall

Season 1

Season 2

Home media 
The first season was released on DVD on July 21, 2020. 

The second season was released on DVD on July 13, 2021.

References

External links 
 
 

2010s American sitcoms
2019 American television series debuts
2020s American sitcoms
2021 American television series endings
CBS original programming
English-language television shows
Television series about widowhood
Television series by CBS Studios
Television series about families
Television shows set in North Carolina
Television series by Kapital Entertainment